Juan Andrés de Ustariz de Vertizberea (March 31, 1656, Narbarte, Navarre – May 19, 1718) was a Royal Governor of Chile during the early 18th century.

In his 1715 trial of residence Ustariz was accused of having supported Alejandro Garzón's insubordination towards the Governor of Chiloé José Marín de Velasco in a round that derived in the 1712 Huilliche rebellion in Chiloé Archipelago. Further Ustariz would have protected Garzón after the latter fled from Calbuco. This done, Marín was reconstituted as Royal Governor of Chiloé in 1715.

References

Sources

1656 births
1718 deaths
People from the Kingdom of Navarre
Royal Governors of Chile
Spanish generals
Knights of Santiago
People from Ultzamaldea
17th-century Spanish people
18th-century Spanish people